Rock Billy Boogie is a studio album by Robert Gordon, released on RCA Records in 1979. It peaked at number 106 on the Billboard 200 chart.

Critical reception

Bruce Eder of AllMusic gave the album 4 stars out of 5, saying, "there's not a bad song, or even a less-than-first-rate performance anywhere on it." Robert Christgau gave the album a "B" grade, saying, "Gordon's nouveau rockabilly has always been a mite slick and a mite fast, and this is his best album because he's no longer hiding it--his blown notes are just blown notes, not stigmata of authenticity."

Track listing

Personnel
Credits adapted from the album's liner notes.

Musicians
 Robert Gordon – vocals
 Chris Spedding – lead guitar
 Scotty Turner – rhythm guitar
 Rob Stoner – bass guitar, piano (on "The Catman", "It's Only Make Believe" and "Wheel of Fortune")
 Howie Wyeth – drums, piano (on "Am I Blue")
 The Three R's – background vocals (on "All by Myself")
 Terry Vernon – background vocals (on "Black Slacks", "It's Only Make Believe" and "Wheel of Fortune")
 Snooky Bellomo – background vocals (on "The Catman")
 Tish Bellomo – background vocals (on "The Catman")
 Paul Evans – background vocals (on "It's Only Make Believe")
 Marty Nelson – background vocals (on "It's Only Make Believe")
 Robin Grean – background vocals (on "It's Only Make Believe")

Technical
 Jimmy Wisner – string arrangement
 Richard Gottehrer – production
 Rob Freeman – engineering
 Eric Block – engineering assistance
 Greg Calbi – mastering
 Acy Lehman – art direction
 Dick Smith – art direction
 Nick Sangiamo – cover photography
 Gary Green – inner sleeve photography

Charts

References

External links
 

1979 albums
RCA Records albums
Robert Gordon (musician) albums
albums produced by Richard Gottehrer